The New Democratic Party of Ontario ran a full slate of candidates in the 1985 Ontario provincial election, and won 25 out of 130 seats to become the third-largest party in the legislature.  Many of the party's candidates have their own biography pages; information on others may be found here.

Michael Cormier (St. Catharines)

Cormier has worked for the Faculty of Law at the University of Western Ontario in London.  He received 5,624 votes (15.81%), finishing third against Liberal incumbent Jim Bradley.

He testified before the provincial standing committee on Finance and Economic Affairs in 2004, in his capacity as executive director the Huron Perth Community Legal Clinic.  His presentation focused on themes of social justice for marginalized persons.

1985